The Jones Cup Invitational is an annual amateur golf tournament. It has been played since 2001 at Ocean Forest Golf Club in Sea Island, Georgia. It was originally biannual but it became an annual event in 2009. It is an individual 54-hole stroke-play competition.

It is a "category A" tournament in the World Amateur Golf Ranking, meaning it is one of the top 30 men's amateur tournaments in the world.

Winners
2023 David Ford
2022 Palmer Jackson
2021 Ludvig Åberg
2020 Davis Thompson
2019 Akshay Bhatia
2018 Garrett Barber
2017 Braden Thornberry
2016 Beau Hossler
2015 Austin Connelly
2014 Corey Conners
2013 Sean Dale
2012 Justin Thomas
2011 John Peterson
2010 Patrick Reed
2009 Kyle Stanley
2007 Luke List
2005 Nicholas Thompson
2003 Gregg Jones
2001 D. J. Trahan

References

External links
Official site
List of winners

Amateur golf tournaments in the United States
Golf in Georgia (U.S. state)
Recurring sporting events established in 2001
2001 establishments in Georgia (U.S. state)